Hannah O'Neill (born January 8, 1993) is a New Zealand ballet dancer who is an étoile with the Paris Opera Ballet.

Early life
O'Neill was born in Japan to a Japanese mother, Sumie, and a New Zealand father, Chris, a professional rugby player. She has two younger brothers. O'Neill started dancing when she was three years old.

From 1998 to 2007, O'Neill studied at the Kishibe Ballet Studio in Tokyo, Japan. When she turned eight, she moved with her family to Auckland, New Zealand. There, she attended Parnell District School and Epsom Girls' Grammar School. She studied ballet at the Mt Eden Ballet Academy and then in 2008, at the age of 15, moved to Melbourne to study at the Australian Ballet School. In 2011 she graduated as dux of the ballet school.

Career
In 2009, O'Neill won the Prix de Lausanne, the world’s most prestigious competition for young dancers. The next year, she won first place in the senior woman's section at the Youth America Grand Prix in New York. Following these achievements, she passed Paris Opera Ballet's external audition in July 2011 and was accepted into its corps de ballet with a seasonal contract. In August 2012 she was offered a second short-term contract with the company.

Succeeding in the external audition in July 2013, O'Neill was offered a life-time contract. Now a regular member of the Paris Opera Ballet, O'Neill moved up through the ranks, being promoted in each Paris Opera Ballet internal promotion contest from 2013 to 2015. On 3 November 2015, she was ranked first in the Paris Opera Ballet internal promotion contest.  Consequently, since 1 January 2016 she danced as a premiere danseuse, the second highest rank in the company.

In spring 2015, O'Neill danced the role of Odette/Odile in Swan Lake which is normally reserved for étoiles. Her second leading role as a premiere danseuse was the title role in Giselle.

In 2020, O'Neill danced The Swan in Misty Copeland's fundraiser, Swans for Relief, a response to the impact of the COVID-19 coronavirus pandemic on the dance community, with funds going to participating dancers' companies and other related relief funds.

In March 2023, O'Neill was promoted to the rank of danseuse étoile at the Paris Opera Ballet.

Repertoire
Odile-Odette in Swan Lake
Giselle, Myrtha in Giselle
Gamzatti in La Bayadère
Paquita in Paquita
Ballet Imperial
The Sylph, Effie in La Sylphide
Titania in Balanchine's A Midsummer Night's Dream
The Lady of the Camellias
Ballet Imperial
Carmen in Roland Petit's Carmen
M in Mats Ek's Carmen

Awards
O'Neill was the winner of the Prix de Lausanne in 2009 and of the Youth America Grand Prix in 2010. In 2014, she won the silver medal at Varna International Ballet Competition, the oldest and one of the most prestigious ballet competitions in the world. In 2016, she received the Best Female Dancer award at the Benois de la Danse competition for her performance in the title role of the ballet Paquita. She is the first New Zealand and second Japanese-born recipient of the award, after Mariko Kida.

References

External links
Hannah O’Neill, website of the Paris Opera

1993 births
Living people
New Zealand ballerinas
People educated at Epsom Girls' Grammar School
Paris Opera Ballet dancers
Australian Ballet School alumni
People from Tokyo
21st-century New Zealand dancers
Prix Benois de la Danse winners
Prix de Lausanne winners
New Zealand people of Japanese descent
New Zealand expatriates in France
New Zealand expatriates in Australia